The Quinta de Bolivar is a colonial house in Bogota, Colombia, that served as a residence to Simon Bolivar in the capital after the war of independence. It is now used as a museum dedicated to Bolivar's life and times.

History
The history of the house goes back to the late 17th century when the land was sold by the chaplain of Monserrate to Jose Antonio Portocarreño, a Spanish merchant, who built a country house there. After his death his heirs could not maintain the property and it had seriously deteriorated by the time the newly independent government bought it and gave it to Bolivar as a sign of gratitude for his role in the war of independence. The house was restored for his use and between 1820 and 1830 Bolivar stayed there for a short time whenever he visited Bogota.

After Bolivar had to abandon the capital, he gave the house to his friend Jose Ignacio Paris. Later the house changed hands several times and throughout the 19th century it was used for the most diverse purposes: it was a health house, a brewery, a tannery and a girls school. Finally in 1919, when the property was again up for sale, the Colombian Historic Society and the Embellishment Society of Bogota began a national fund-raising campaign in order to buy it. After it had been purchased as a national monument, it became a museum with artifacts from the independence times including objects belonging to Simon Bolivar. It is also used as a venue for diplomatic and cultural events. Several important restoration projects have taken place in both the house and gardens and some infrastructure work has been undertaken to adapt the property to its current function.

On January 17, 1974, in a symbolic act, Álvaro Fayad, a co-founder of the guerrilla movement M-19 stole Bolivar's sword leaving behind a note that began, "Bolivar, your sword returns to the battlefield." On January 31, 1991, Antonio Navarro, a leader of the M-19, returned the sword as part of the group's peace negotiations with the government.

References

Simón Bolívar
Spanish Colonial architecture
Museums in Bogotá
Biographical museums in South America